Kristin Roskifte (born 30 April 1975)  is a Norwegian illustrator and author of picture books. She was awarded the Nordic Council Children and Young People's Literature Prize in 2019 for the picture book  ("Everybody counts"). The jury praised the pictures in the book, and described the text as "poetic and humoristic". As of October 2019, Alle sammen teller had been translated into 27 languages.

Roskifte co-founded the picture book publishing house  in 2007.

Selected works
 (picture book) 
 (picture book) 
 (picture book) 
 (essays) 
 (picture book, with Jan Kjærstad) 
 (picture book) 
 (poetry) 
 (picture book) 
 (co-writer, with Hilde Hagerup) 
 (picture book)

References

External links

1975 births
Living people
Norwegian illustrators
Norwegian women writers
Norwegian women illustrators
Norwegian children's writers
Norwegian children's book illustrators